The Zeidorinae, common name keyhole limpets and slit limpets, is a taxonomic subfamily of limpet-like sea snails, marine gastropod molluscs in the family Fissurellidae, the keyhole limpets and slit limpets.

Genera
 Cornisepta McLean & Geiger, 1998
 Hemimarginula McLean, 2011
 Hemitoma Swainson, 1840
 Montfortia Récluz, 1843
 Montfortista Iredale, 1929
 Montfortulana Habe, 1961
 Octomarginula McLean, 2011
 Profundisepta McLean & Geiger, 1998
 Puncturella R. T. Lowe, 1827
 Zeidora A. Adams, 1860
Genera brought into synonymy
 Cemoria Risso, 1826: synonym of Puncturella R. T. Lowe, 1827
 Cranopsis A. Adams, 1860: synonym of Puncturella R. T. Lowe, 1827
  †Crepiemarginula Seguenza, 1880 : synonym of Zeidora A. Adams, 1860
 Legrandia C. E. Beddome, 1883: synonym of Zeidora A. Adams, 1860 (invalid: junior homonym of Legrandia Hanley, 1872)
 Nesta H. Adams, 1870: synonym of Zeidora A. Adams, 1860
 Sipho T. Brown, 1827: synonym of Puncturella R. T. Lowe, 1827
 Siphonella Issel, 1869: synonym of Montfortista Iredale, 1929 (Invalid: junior homonym of Siphonella Hagenow, 1851)
 Subemarginula Gray, 1847: synonym of Hemitoma Swainson, 1840
 Zidora P. Fischer, 1885: synonym of Zeidora A. Adams, 1860 (invalid: unjustified emendation of Zeidora A. Adams, 1860)

References

 Kuroda, T.; Habe, T.; Oyama, K. (1971). The sea shells of Sagami Bay. Maruzen Co., Tokyo. xix, 1-741

External links
 Cunha T.J., Lemer S., Bouchet P., Kano Y. & Giribet G. (2019). Putting keyhole limpets on the map: phylogeny and biogeography of the globally distributed marine family Fissurellidae (Vetigastropoda, Mollusca). Molecular Phylogenetics and Evolution. 135: 249-269

Fissurellidae